La Galera is a municipality in the comarca Montsià, in the province of Tarragona, Catalonia, Spain. In 2009 its population was 884. La Galera is part of the Taula del Sénia free association of municipalities.

History 
Although it has not been possible to prove it with documents, some historians believe that La Galera has an ancient Roman origin.

However, the earliest documentary evidence about the town is in 1320 when James II of Aragon authorized the control of the village known as Pobla de la Galera to the Archbishop of Tortosa. It is believed that the population had begun to establish itself here by 1303.

Main sights 
The most famous building is the Tower of La Galera. It was built in 1340 as a watchtower and it was built by the residents of the town. It has a rectangular base and a considerable height. In 1684 the interior was converted into a parochial church, dedicated to Sant Llorenç. The reform of the temple was left in suspense during the War of Spanish Succession, when the tower served as a military storehouse. The consecration of the new church took place on August 15, 1711.

Culture
During the 17th century, potters came to live in the town, which has become a local artisan tradition. The town has a museum that explains the manufacture of clay vessels. During the month of May there is a festival of pottery.

La Galera celebrates its main festival in August.

Economy 
The main economic activity is agriculture, particularly olives, carob, wine, and almonds.

References 

Tomàs Bonell, Jordi; Descobrir Catalunya, poble a poble, Prensa Catalana, Barcelona, 1994
Article in the Catalan Encyclopedia

External links 
 General information
 Government data pages 

Municipalities in Montsià
Populated places in Montsià